Junggeun Oh, also Oh Jung Geun (born 27 September 1970, in Seoul, South Korea), is a Korean painter. Living in Berlin since 2004 he paints artworks of a modern minimalism mixing abstraction with realism. The artist is represented by galerie son, Berlin.

Life 

Junggeun Oh studied Fine Arts at Seoul National University in South Korea. During that time he already had been working as a teacher  at Sun-Hwa College of Fine Arts in Seoul and as a lecturer at Won-Kwang University Iksan. In 2004 he moved with his family to Berlin.
He won several awards and scholarships.

Work 

In the early 2000 years Junggeun Oh created highly detailed woodprints that were sometimes over-sized and made of more than 40 plates each.
Since living in Berlin Oh has been working on his series "interspaces" (in German "Zwischenräume“).
Herein he paints (mostly in red) the shapes that buildings draw in the sky as minimalistic abstract forms. 2012 Junggeun Oh designed a Buddy Bear for the ambassy of South Korea.

Publications 
 Junggeun OH, THE PAGE GALLERY, Korea, Seoul, 2012

Notes

External links 
 junggeun-oh.com including the artist's catalogue raisonné

1970 births
Living people
South Korean painters
South Korean contemporary artists
South Korean expatriates in Germany
Seoul National University alumni
Contemporary painters
Postmodern artists
Artists from Seoul
Artists from Berlin